General elections were held in Kuwait on 23 January 1971. A total of 183 candidates contested the election, which saw pro-government candidates remain the largest bloc in Parliament. Voter turnout was 51.6%.

Results

References

Kuwait
Election
Elections in Kuwait
Non-partisan elections